A series of mass protests were held in Armenia following the 2003 presidential election, led by the former presidential candidate Stepan Demirchyan.

Background

Protests

April 12, 2004
2003 Armenian Presidential election opposition candidate Stepan Demirchyan, who was the official runner-up of that election, was defeated by Robert Kocharyan in the second round. Demirchya started a  protest demanding authority retirement in the Freedom Square, he later started a rally to Presidential Palace, but police blocked the road from the front of National Assembly, after this protesters announced a sit-in, later police attacked protesters to disperse the sit-in.

See also
2008 Armenian presidential election protests
2011 Armenian protests
2013 Armenian protests
 List of protests in the 21st century

References

ԱՐՏԱՇԵՍ ԳԵՂԱՄՅԱՆԸ ԱՊՐԻԼԻ 13-Ը ՀԱՄԵՄԱՏԵՑ ԱՎԱՐԱՅՐԻ, ՍԱՐԴԱՐԱՊԱՏԻ, ԲԱՇ ԱՊԱՐԱՆԻ ՀԵՐՈՍԱՄԱՐՏԵՐԻ ՀԵՏ...
HRW
A1plus

Protests
Protests
Human rights abuses in Armenia
Protests in Armenia
Armenian
Armenian
Armenian democracy movements